The 1929 Major League Baseball season was contested from April 16 to October 14, 1929. The Chicago Cubs and Philadelphia Athletics were the regular season champions of the National League and American League, respectively. The Athletics then defeated the Cubs in the World Series, four games to one.

Babe Ruth hit his 500th career home run this season on August 11th at Cleveland. Game 4 of the World Series featured a historic 10-run rally by the Athletics, nicknamed "The Mack Attack," after the team's manager, Connie Mack.

This was the last of eight seasons that "League Awards", a precursor to the Major League Baseball Most Valuable Player Award (introduced in 1931), were issued. Only a National League award was given in 1929.

Schedule 

Each team played 154 regular season games, which were all played within the team's respective league.  With this schedule, 22 games were played with each team of the same league.  This format had started in the 1920 season and lasted until 1961 (1962 in the National league).

Awards and honors
League Award
 Rogers Hornsby, Chicago Cubs, 2B

Statistical leaders

Standings

American League

National League

Postseason

Bracket

Managers

American League

National League

Home Field Attendance

Key events
Babe Ruth: On August 11, Babe Ruth became the first player to hit 500 home runs.
Philadelphia Athletics and Chicago Cubs: First season since 1912 that both pennant winners won by more than 10 games.
Philadelphia Athletics: On October 12, during Game 4 of the World Series, the Philadelphia Athletics scored ten runs in the seventh inning to come back from an 8–0 deficit.  This was soon dubbed "The Mack Attack," after long-time manager Connie Mack.  He commented that it was "The greatest thrill [he] had in 29 years of managing."  At the time, this was a record.

Deaths
 Miller Huggins, the Yankees manager, died of blood poisoning on September 25.

References

External links
1929 Major League Baseball season schedule at Baseball Reference

 
Major League Baseball seasons